Northside is a neighborhood in Cincinnati, Ohio. It was originally known as Cumminsville, but changed names to "Northside" several decades ago after I-74 divided the neighborhood into Northside and South Cumminsville. The population was 8,096 at the 2020 census. Northside has a very racially and socio-economically diverse population, with concentrations of college students, artists, young professionals, and many members of the creative class. In recent years, Northside has earned a reputation as welcoming to Cincinnati's gay and lesbian community. 

Northside has been described as "hip," "alternative," "progressive," and "liberal." There are numerous shops and restaurants in the neighborhood, most of them independently owned. Northside has been noted as "one of the best dining neighborhoods in [Cincinnati]." During the warmer months the Northside Community Council sponsors a farmer's market in Hoffner Park. Many of Cincinnati's original bands can be heard at Northside Tavern.

The neighborhood's popular Fourth of July celebrations, which include the Northside Fourth of July Parade and the Northside Rock and Roll Carnival draw citizens from across the region.

Northside's community includes an urban garden co-op that provides "access to healthy food for all residents of the community," as well as a volunteer bicycle co-op that promotes and provides cycling to residents. To combat crime Northside's community replaced a troubled corner with two "green" homes. Northside is bordered by the neighborhoods of Clifton, Mount Airy, Spring Grove Village, College Hill, and Westwood.

Demographics

Source - City of Cincinnati Statistical Database
Note - Wards were combined with South Cumminsville so numbers prior to 1900 include population of South Cumminsville

History
Northside was a small settlement in Indian territory until the introduction of the Miami and Erie Canal in the 1820s caused the population to grow. The settlement became known as "Cumminsville" after David Cummins, one of site's original settlers.  He ran a tannery, served as a judge in Indiana, and may have been the first "born of Cincinnati".

In 1873, Cumminsville was annexed by the city of Cincinnati. The area continued to grow through the 1920s and at one point the business area called Knowlton's Corner was one of the busiest commercial areas in Cincinnati. However, once the highway system was put in place people no longer had reason to live near work and shopping so they left for more rural neighborhoods and villages. Once people left housing prices dropped and people with less money moved in. They could not support the businesses so they quickly left too. By the 1960s most of the industry in Cumminsville had left. However, in the 1980s the area began to grow in popularity due to its undervalued homes.  Among the buildings that survived this transition were the two Domhoff Buildings, located at the junction of Chase and Hamilton Avenues.  Seen as key to this redevelopment process was the restoration of the abandoned former factory of the American Can Company on Spring Grove Avenue; a longtime neighborhood eyesore, it was redeveloped in the late 2000s as part of a process to enhance the neighborhood's livability and attractiveness to outsiders.

LGBTQIA+ presence
Northside is commonly known as one of Cincinnati's primary LGBTQ neighborhoods. It became home to the Gay & Lesbian Community Center of Greater Cincinnati in 1999 until November 9, 2013 (Center became an "on-line entity" making grants to the local LGBTQIA+ allied community). The Cincinnati Pride Parade and Festival was held in Hoffner Park along Hamilton Avenue for a decade (2000 - 2009). Beginning in 2010, the Greater Cincinnati Gay Chamber of Commerce began organizing the Greater Cincinnati Pride Parade moving it to Downtown. In the same year, local community members wanted there to be a continuing " gay pride presence" in the neighborhood and the first Northside Pride event was held in August in Hoffner Park and along the Hamilton Avenue business district.  This effort to keep a gay "pride event" in Northside ended in 2012. Currently, the July 4 neighborhood parade also has a strong LGBTQIA+ allied presence.

Notable people
 Rev. Peter Fossett, ex-slave, minister, caterer, Underground Railroad conductor
 Sarah M. Fossett, Peter's wife, desegregated streetcars in 1860
 C. E. Morgan, writer, grew up in Northside and set a portion of her novel The Sport of Kings in the neighborhood

See also
Hoffner Historic District

References

Neighborhoods in Cincinnati
Gay villages in Ohio
Restaurant districts and streets in the United States
Populated places established in 1873
Former municipalities in Ohio